Due to popular demand, Canada Post released the 68 specially designed stamps as a series of 17 Millennium souvenir sheets from December 17th, 1999 to March 17th, 2000 each depicting four different stamps.

December 1999
This first series highlights pivotal Canadian subjects in the world of entertainment and the arts, including IMAX motion-picture technology, the Calgary Stampede, singer Félix Leclerc and the National Film Board. The simultaneously released Millennium Souvenir Sheet OFDCs will be cancelled in Ottawa.

The Millennium Collection, Canadian Entertainment
 Calgary Stampede
Famous throughout the world, the Calgary Stampede has put the wild in West for more than eight decades, thrilling visitors with traditional rodeo events such as chuckwagon racing, calf roping and bareback bronc riding.
 Cirque du Soleil
A spectacular blend of music, theatre, dance and acrobatics, Cirque du Soleil has blossomed from a group of Quebec buskers into an award-winning troupe of more than 550 performers whose shows have wowed millions worldwide.
 Hockey Night in Canada
Play-by-play announcers have brought the excitement of Canada's national game into our living rooms since Foster Hewitt first went on the air in 1923. Today few broadcasting institutions are as entrenched in our culture as Hockey Night in Canada and the French-language La Soirée du hockey.
  La Soirée du hockey: Live From the Forum 
Today, few broadcasting institutions are as entrenched in our culture as Hockey Night in Canada and the French-language La Soirée du hockey. During his 33 years with La Soirée, announcer René Lecavalier created a unique lexicon for the sport that is still used today.

The Millennium Collection, Extraordinary Entertainers
  Félix Leclerc
Considered the father of modern Quebec song, playwright and actor Félix Leclerc paved the way for the popular chansonnier movement and influenced the careers of many successful singers.
 Glenn Gould
Glenn Gould was one of the 20th century's most brilliant pianists. Celebrated for his unique interpretations of the work of Bach, Beethoven and other composers, the Toronto native's legacy included more than 80 works and numerous awards.
 Guy Lombardo
The leader of the top band in North America in its day, Guy Lombardo was best known for his legendary 48-years stint in New York City, where he and his Royal Canadians performed live for annual New Year's Eve broadcasts.
 Portia White
Nova Scotia-born contralto Portia White helped break the colour barrier in classical music during the 1940s, dazzling concert hall audiences in North America and abroad with her stunning voice.

The Millennium Collection, Fostering Canadian Talent
 Canada Council
One of the country's most valued institutions, the Canada Council fosters the creativity of new and established artists by providing a range of grants and services to individuals, groups, professional organizations, galleries and publishing houses.
 Canadian Broadcasting Corporation
From its early days in radio to its present dynamic television networks, the Canadian Broadcasting Corporation has helped shape our national consciousness through its commitment to high-quality current affairs and entertainment programming.
 National Film Board of Canada
Dedicated to showcasing the voice and vision of Canadian filmmakers, the National Film Board of Canada, represented here by John Spotton, has produced more than 9,000 original films and earned numerous international awards over the past 60 years.
 Royal Canadian Academy of Arts
The Toronto-based Royal Canadian Academy of Arts is the oldest national organization of professional Canadian artists, and was instrumental in establishing the National Gallery of Canada in Ottawa.

The Millennium Collection, Media Technologies
 IMAX
Originated at Montreal's Expo 67, IMAX gives movie audience a larger-than-life experience by projecting dazzling images shot on special large-format film onto screens up to eight storeys high.
 Sir William Stephenson
Before becoming an Allied super spy during the Second World War, Sir William Stephenson developed a radio facsimile device that revolutionized the newspaper industry by enabling the wireless transmission of publishable photographs.
 Softimage
Montreal-based Softimage Co. is the world's leading 2-D and 3-D animation software designer and the wizard behind the stunning special effects in such Oscar-winning blockbusters as Jurassic Park and Titanic.
 Ted Rogers, Sr.
Ted Rogers Sr. invented a tube which allowed hum-free radios to be plugged directly into electrical outlets. His work lives on in his son's telecommunications empire, which spans everything from cable television to Internet access.

January 2000
January's series of four Millennium souvenir sheets features, among others, Lester B. Pearson, Terry Fox and CIDA. These bold 112-by-108 mm souvenir sheets frame four 36-by-48 mm stamps in thematic groupings that celebrate Canadian giants in fields as diverse as medicine, finance, peacekeeping and international development.

The Millennium Collection, Hearts of Gold
 CIDA
Established in 1968, the Canadian International Development Agency is responsible for administering the bulk of Canada's foreign aid budget to provide assistance for sustainable development projects in more than 100 countries.
 Canadian Missionaries
For more than a century, Canadian missionaries have dedicated their lives to working in the developing world. Montreal-born surgeon Lucille Teasdale spent more than 30 years running a hospital in Uganda before dying of AIDS she contracted while operating on an infected patient.
 Meals on Wheels
Introduced in Brantford, Ontario, in 1963, Meals on Wheels has grown to a nationwide movement with thousands of volunteers delivering nutritious meals to seniors, many of whom are poor and homebound.
 Terry Fox
Although his illness forced him to give up his Marathon of Hope, the spirit of one of Canada's most courageous young men lives on in the annual Terry Fox Run, which has earned more than $200 million for cancer research.

The Millennium Collection, Humanitarians and Peacekeepers
 Banning Landmines
Canada has played an integral role in banning anti-personal landmines, which claim an average of 500 victims a week. In 1997, 122 countries signed the historic Ottawa Convention prohibiting the use of these devices and calling for their destruction.
 Lester B. Pearson
Lester B Pearson's involvement in the creation of an international force to maintain peace in the Middle East during the Suez Crisis earned him a Nobel Peace Prize and highlighted Canada's role as a global peacekeeper.
 Pauline Vanier and Elizabeth Smellie
The wife of future Governor General Georges Vanier, Pauline Vanier served as a Red Cross volunteer in Paris during and after the Second World War. Elizabeth Smellie, the first female colonel in the Canadian Army, headed nursing services at home and abroad during both World Wars and organized the Canadian Women's Army Corps.
 Raoul Dandurand
A tireless promoter of equality, peace with justice, and security through cooperation, Montreal-born lawyer Raoul Dandurand spent 44 years as a senator and was named president of the League of Nations.

The Millennium Collection, Medical Innovators 
 Sir Frederick Banting
Nobel Prize-winner Sir Frederick Banting was one of the century's greatest medical heroes. His discovery of a pancreatic extract called insulin, achieved with his assistant Charles Best and other colleagues, has saved the lives of millions of diabetics.
 Armand Frappier
A champion in the war against disease, Quebec physician Armand Frappier helped establish a preventative treatment for infant leukemia and founded studies in immunology, advanced microbiology and hygiene at the Université de Montréal.
 Maude Abbott
Curator of the McGill University Medical Museum and a founder of the Federation of Medical Women of Canada, Dr. Maude Abbott overcame the gender-based odds against her to become an internationally respected pathologist and a world authority on heart defects.
 Dr. Hans Selye
The scientific work of Vienna-born Hans Selye, an endocrinologist at the Université de Montréal, greatly increased our understanding of the biological factors causing stress and of how to control it.

The Millennium Collection, Social Progress
 Alphonse and Dorimène Desjardins
Founded a century ago by Alphonse and Dorimène Desjardins, the caisse populaire is Quebec's largest financial institution and the global model for savings and loan cooperatives where customers are both owners and users.
 Health Care
Canada's tradition of universal access to health care owes much to the efforts of the religious orders that established Quebec's first hospitals, and to the example set by Saskatchewan when it became the first province to enact full medicare coverage.
 Moses Coady
Moses Coady's vision of social betterment through adult education launched a revolutionary cooperative movement in the Maritimes that is still emulated by social activists and educators, particularly in developing countries.
 Women's Rights
Tireless dedication to equal rights spurred five Alberta women to victory in a historic court ruling that recognized women as qualified for Senate appointments - thereby paving the way for Canada's first female senator in 1930.

February 2000
February's Millennium souvenir sheets continue the tribute to the wide range of Canadian people, events and institutions that have helped shape our nation. This third release - the second last in the series - presents such individuals as philosopher Northrop Frye and "Plouffe Family" author Roger Lemelin and celebrates the spirit and vision of Canadian philanthropy. Aboriginal contributions to peace, healing and sport are featured, as well as Canada's proud heritage in the theatre and popular literature.

The Millennium Collection, A Tradition of Generosity 
 Eric Lafferty Harvie
After drillers struck oil on land where he held mineral rights, lawyer Eric Lafferty Harvie used much of the resulting multimillion-dollar fortune benevolently. He assisted such diverse organizations as Glenbow Foundation, the Calgary Zoo and the Banff Centre for the Arts.
 Izaak Walton Killam
The wealthiest Canadian of his day, Nova Scotia-born financial wizard Izaak Walton Killam and his wife Dorothy donated a large part of their fortune to supporting the arts, education and sciences in Canada. Established in 1968, the Canadian International Development Agency is responsible for administering the bulk of Canada's foreign aid budget to provide assistance for sustainable development projects in more than 100 countries.
 Massey Foundation
Hart Massey's estate, which became the Massey Foundation in 1918, has supported many philanthropic endeavours.
 Macdonald Stewart Foundation
This Montreal-based foundation has promoted and preserved a great deal of Canada's historical and cultural heritage.

The Millennium Collection, Canada's Cultural Fabric
 L'Anse aux Meadows
The oldest known European settlement in the New World, l'Anse aux Meadows, Newfoundland, was established by Norse colonists a thousand years ago.
 Neptune Theatre
Halifax is home to a cultural tradition that took root in the early 17th century, when the Neptune Theatre's predecessor, Le Théâtre de Neptune de la Nouvelle-France held its first performance at Port Royal, Nova Scotia.
 Pier 21
In the past century, some 1.5 million immigrants, refugees and displaced persons arrived on our shores at Halifax's Pier 21, which served as a symbol of hope, dreams and opportunity for newcomers to Canada.
 Stratford Festival
Although its history spans just less than 50 years, Ontario's Stratford Festival has become the jewel of North American classical theatre, specialized in showcasing the works of William Shakespeare.

The Millennium Collection, Canada's First Peoples
 Aboriginal Peoples
Aboriginal peoples have always been a vital part of Canada's heritage. Believed to possess supernatural powers, the shaman plays an integral role in Aboriginal life, serving as a mystical guide who helps heal the sick, influence the weather, and interpret dreams. Shamans and elders take a holistic approach to health based on physical, emotional, psychological and spiritual balance.
 Inuit Shaman
Believed to possess supernatural powers, the shaman plays an integral role in Aboriginal life, serving as a mystical guide who helps heal the sick, influence the weather, and interpret dreams. Shamans and elders take a holistic approach to health based on physical, emotional, psychological and spiritual balance.
 Pontiac
A noble warrior and chief of the Odawa tribe during the 18th century, Pontiac persuaded the British crown to recognize the legal rights of Aboriginal tribes to claim title to the lands they occupied.
 Tom Longboat
Nicknamed "Wildfire" for his amazing speed, Onondaga distance runner Tom Longboat was one of the most celebrated athletes of the early 1900s, and the fastest professional in the world over 15 miles.

The Millennium Collection, Canada's Great Thinkers
 Hilda Marion Neatby
Head of the history department at the University of Saskatchewan, Hilda Marion Neatby had a lifelong love of learning, and stressed the importance of challenging the human mind.
 Marshall McLuhan
Edmonton-born Marshall McLuhan remains a cultural icon as Canada's pioneer pop philosopher and oracle of the electronic age. An English professor and literary critic, his books revolutionized thinking about media and communications.
 Northrop Frye
Regarded as one of the world's most influential literary critics, Northrop Frye's prolific and frequently cited writings outlined the shape of human thought and helped educate our imaginations about the power of the written world.
 Roger Lemelin
The literary patriarch of the fictional Plouffe family whose exploits were later immortalized on both film and television, Roger Lemelin was a pioneer of social realism in French-speaking Canada.

The Millennium Collection, Literary Legends 
 Gratien Gélinas
A talented actor, director, producer and playwright, Gratien Gélinas is considered the father of contemporary Quebec theatre. His remarkable career ran the gamut from staging theatrical revues to co-founding Montreal's National Theatre School.
 Harlequin
Manitoba's chilly capital is the birthplace of a sizzling romantic literary tradition that transformed Harlequin Books from a small company into the world's leading paperback publisher. Today, its titles appear in 24 languages.
 Pierre Tisseyre
Pierre Tisseyre promoted Canada's French-language literary tradition by adapting the book-of-the-month club concept for a Quebec readership. His publishing house has help launch the careers of numerous Quebec writers.
 W.O. Mitchell
W.O. Mitchell is one of Canada's most celebrated writers. The Saskatchewan-born novelist and dramatist's carefully crafted prose - which include the classical Who Has Seen the Wind - reveal a gifted artist intrigued by the human experience.

March 2000
March's series of four Millennium Souvenir Sheets features among other, Bell Canada, Bombardier, the Canadian Space Program and McCain Foods. These bold 112 x 108 mm souvenir sheets frame four 36 x 48 mm stamps in thematic groupings that celebrate Canadian giants in fields as diverse as engineering, commerce and innovation.

The Millennium Collection, Engineering and Technological Marvels
 Rogers Pass
The longest tunnel in North America provides safe passage through the avalanche prone Rogers Pass in British Columbia.
 Manic Dams
Québec's 455-km long Manicouagan River supports one of the world's largest hydroelectric operations.
 Canadian Space Program
A world leader in space exploration, Canada's technological innovations include a robotic Canadarm used aboard US shuttle missions and the Mobile Servicing System foe the International Space Station.
 CN Tower
Standing 553.33 metres tall, the CN Tower, which was built in 1976, was the world's tallest building and free standing structure until 2009.

The Millennium Collection, Enterprising Giants

 Bell Canada Enterprises
Canada's largest communication company, Bell Canada Enterprises is a global industry player that offers telephone, satellite television and other communication services to clients in 150 countries around the world.
 Hudson's Bay Company
Over the more than three centuries since it began as a fur trading business in the Canadian wilderness, the Hudson's Bay Company has grown into our nation's largest non-food retailer through its chain of Bay and Zellers department stores. Canada's largest communication company, Bell Canada Enterprises is a global industry player that offers telephone, satellite television and other communication services to clients in 150 countries around the world.
 Rose-Anna Vachon
From the kitchen where founder Rose-Anna Vachon perfected her tiny treats to a modern bakery that turns out some two million cakes daily, the Vachon company of Sainte-Marie-de-Beauce, Quebec, has been tantalizing tastebuds since 1923.
 George Weston
Founded in 1882, George Weston Limited has expanded from baking bread and biscuits to a conglomerate that includes the country's largest food distributor, Loblaws Companies Limited.

The Millennium Collection, Fathers of Invention
 Abraham Gesner
Abraham Gesner gave the world a better light by creating a new lamp oil called kerosene in 1846. Recognized as the founder of the oil industry, his process for distilling bituminous material was later used to produce petroleum.
 Alexander Graham Bell
Known around the globe as the father of the telephone, Alexander Graham Bell made numerous scientific discoveries at his home on Cape Breton Island, where he worked on everything from a person-carrying kite to a record-setting hydrofoil.
 George Klein
Canada's most prolific modern inventor, Hamilton-born engineer George Klein developed ground-breaking technologies in the fields of health, space and transportation, and headed the design of Canada's first nuclear reactor.
 Joseph-Armand Bombardier
Quebec mechanic Joseph-Armand Bombardier changed winter recreation and travel forever with his invention of the snowmobile. Since selling its first Ski-Doo in 1959, Bombardier has also expanded into the rail, aerospace and defence sectors.

The Millennium Collection, Food, Glorious Food!
 Archibald Gowanlock Huntsman
Ontario-born marine biologist Archibald Gowanlock Huntsman pioneered methods of packaging frozen fish fillets in the late 1920s, thirty years before the technique became a viable business.
 McCain Foods
Thanks to the strong business acumen of a New Brunswick family, McCain Foods Limited has grown from a small factory to a group of companies that earns $5.1 billion annually from its frozen food products.
 Pablum
Babies of the world have Canadian pediatrician Frederick Tisdall and his collaborators to thank for the popular ready-to-eat cereal Pablum. Developed as a healthy yet tasty solid food, its sales have raised millions for pediatric research.
 Sir Charles Saunders
Sir Charles Saunders established Canada's reputation as a leading producer of quality wheat by developing a new strain called Marquis, which matured early, produced a high yield and had superior milling and baking qualities.

See also
 Millennium stamp

References

Postage stamps of Canada